IBN or ibn may refer to:

Communications and media
 CNN-News18, Indian news TV channel, formerly CNN-IBN
 Islamic Broadcast Network, Trinidad and Tobago TV station

Other uses
 ibn, patronymic ("son of") in Arabic
 Code page 865, known as IBN in BBS software
 ICICI Bank (NYSE: IBN), bank based in India
 Invariant basis number, in mathematical ring theory
 Internet background noise